Five Evenings is  a Soviet drama film by Nikita Mikhalkov in 1978  based on the same name play by Aleksandr Volodin.

Plot
Tamara lives with her nephew Slavik, whose mother died in the war. Tamara herself works as a master at the factory, she is a member of the party, not married. Ilyin says that he works as chief engineer at a chemical plant in Podgorsk. He remains with Tamara, and soon meets Slavik. During the conversation, in response to Slavik's ironic recall of Tamara, Ilyin warns Slavik that he will not allow unkind words about her.

Cast
 Stanislav Lyubshin as Aleksandr  (vocal by Sergey Nikitin)
 Lyudmila Gurchenko as  Tamara
 Igor Nefyodov as Slavik
 Aleksandr Adabashyan as Timofeyev
 Valentina Telichkina as Zoya

Awards
 Valladolid International Film Festival — Best Actor (Stanislav Lyubshin)
 Soviet Screen Award — Best Actor (Stanislav Lyubshin)
 55th place in the  list of  100 best films according to Russian Guild of Film Critics

References

External links
 
 Пять вечеров (1978) — Музей кино

1978 films
1970s Russian-language films
Russian films based on plays
Soviet drama films
Films set in the 1950s
Films set in the Soviet Union
Films set in Russia
Films shot in Russia
Films directed by Nikita Mikhalkov
Films scored by Eduard Artemyev
Mosfilm films
1978 drama films
Soviet films based on plays
Russian drama films
Films with screenplays by Nikita Mikhalkov